Bommalattam is 1968 Indian Tamil-language comedy film, directed by Muktha Srinivasan and produced by V. Ramaswamy. The screenplay was written by Cho Ramaswamy from a story by Madurai Thirumaran. It stars Jaishankar, Jayalalithaa, Nagesh, Major Sundarrajan, Cho Ramaswamy and Manorama. V. S. Raghavan, Sachu and O. A. K. Thevar play key roles. The film was released on 31 May 1968.

Plot

Cast 
 Jaishankar as Sukumar
 Jayalalithaa as Malathi
 Nagesh as Durai
 Manorama as Chinna Ponnu
 Cho Ramaswamy as Jaambazaar Jaggu
 Sachu as Geetha
 Vennira Aadai Moorthy as Sukumar's father
 Major Sundarrajan as Rathnam/Bal Raj
 V. S. Raghavan as Dr. Dhamodharan
 O. A. K. Thevar as Chithambaram
 K. K. Soundar as Rathnam's henchman

Soundtrack 
Music was composed by V. Kumar and lyrics were written by Vaali, Alangudi Somu, Na. Pandurangan and Avinasi Mani. For the song "Vaa Vathiyare", Srinivasan wanted the usage of Madras Bashai, but Vaali felt it was hard for him, so M. L. Govind was hired to "provide the apt words to go with it", leading to the birth of lines in the song like "Jambaar Jakku, Na Saidapetta Kokku". That also became Tamil cinema's first gaana song. "Vaa Vathiyare", sung by Manorama became popular, and in 1991 HMV released a compilation album under the same title, featuring songs sung by Manorama.

Reception 
Kalki appreciated the animated opening titles, but criticised the film's title for lacking relevance to the story.

References

External links 
 

1960s Tamil-language films
1968 comedy films
1968 films
Films directed by Muktha Srinivasan
Indian black-and-white films
Indian comedy films